Langstrand (Afrikaans and German for "Long Beach", which the residential area is often called, too, among English-speaking tourists) is a small beach resort on the Atlantic coast in western Namibia. Langstrand and its neighboring sister resort Dolfynstrand lies between Walvis Bay and Swakopmund.

Langstrand is governed by the municipality of Walvis Bay. It is popular for escaping the interior summer heat in Namibia. The area came into recent fame because the Burning Shore Hotel, where Angelina Jolie and Brad Pitt stayed during the end of her pregnancy with Shiloh, is located in Langstrand.

External links 

 Langstrand.de (private Website - German)

References

Walvis Bay
Populated coastal places in Namibia
Populated places in the Erongo Region